La Place de l'Étoile may refer to:
 Place de l'Étoile, the historical name of Place Charles de Gaulle, a road junction in Paris
 La Place de l'Étoile (novel), a 1968 novel by Patrick Modiano